Connie Mathisen is a Norwegian handball player. She played nine matches for the Norway women's national handball team in 1993.  She participated at the 1993 World Women's Handball Championship, where the Norwegian team placed third.

References

Year of birth missing (living people)
Living people
Norwegian female handball players
20th-century Norwegian women